The 2010–11 Northwestern Wildcats men's basketball team represented Northwestern University in the 2010–11 college basketball season. This is head coach Bill Carmody's eleventh season at the Northwestern. The Wildcats were members of the Big Ten Conference and played their home games at Welsh-Ryan Arena. In the previous year, they finished the season 20–14, 7–10 in Big Ten play, lost in the quarterfinals of the 2010 Big Ten Conference men's basketball tournament and were invited to the 2010 National Invitation Tournament where they lost in the quarterfinals to Washington State.

2010–11 Roster

Source:

Schedule and results
Source

|-
!colspan=12 style=| Exhibition

|-
!colspan=12 style=| Regular season    

|-
!colspan=12 style=| Big Ten tournament

|-
!colspan=12 style=| NIT

References

Northwestern Wildcats
Northwestern Wildcats men's basketball seasons
Northwestern
Northwestern Wild
Northwestern Wild